Kenneth J. Donnelly (July 15, 1950 – April 2, 2017) was a Massachusetts state senator for the Fourth Middlesex district, which included his hometown of Arlington and several other cities. He was a Democrat who served from 2009-17.

Donnelly graduated from the University of Massachusetts Amherst with a BA in Labor Studies.

He was a retired lieutenant with the Lexington Fire Department in Lexington, Massachusetts.

On June 17, 2014, Donnelly endorsed fellow Democrat Don Berwick in the Massachusetts gubernatorial election, 2014.

Donnelly died on April 2, 2017 in Arlington, Massachusetts from complications of a brain tumor, aged 66.

References

External links
Ken Donnelly's website

1950 births
2017 deaths
American firefighters
Democratic Party Massachusetts state senators
People from Arlington, Massachusetts
University of Massachusetts Amherst College of Social and Behavioral Sciences alumni
21st-century American politicians
Deaths from brain cancer in the United States